The Desert Music is a work of music for voices and orchestra composed by the  minimalist composer Steve Reich. It is based on texts by William Carlos Williams and takes its title from the poetry anthology The Desert Music and Other Poems. The composition consists of five movements, with a duration of about 46 minutes. In both its arrangement of thematic material and use of tempi, the piece is in a characteristic arch form (ABCBA). The piece was composed in 1983 and had its world premiere on 17 March 1984 in Cologne, Germany.

The formation of the piece is explained by the composer as follows:

Orchestration 
The piece is scored for a chorus of 27 voices: nine sopranos, and six each of altos, tenors and basses.

The orchestra calls for:
 4 flutes (doubling on 3 piccolos), 4 oboes (doubling on 3 cor anglais), 4 B clarinets (doubling on 3 B bass clarinets), 4 bassoons (doubling on 1 contrabassoon)
 4 horns, 4 trumpets (doubling on 1 optional piccolo trumpet), 2 trombones, bass trombone, tuba. 
 2 timpani players (doubling rototoms); 7 percussionists (including 2 players on marimba; 2 players on vibraphone; 2 players on xylophones, doubling glockenspiels; maracas paired with sticks; 2 bass drums, and medium tam-tam).
 2 pianos, played by four musicians (doubling 3 synthesizers)
 The strings (12-12-9-9-6) are broken into three sections of (4-4-3-3-2) seated by their section with the first set of 16 players stage right, the next 16 center stage, and the last 16 stage left

There is also a reduced orchestration, prepared by Reich himself, for a chorus of 10 voices (3 sopranos, 3 altos, 2 tenors, 2 basses), accompanied by:
 4 flutes (doubling on 3 piccolos)
 2 horns, 2 trumpets, 3 trombones (all brass optional)
 4 pianos, all doubling synthesizer
 12 solo strings, broken into three quartets, plus one or two basses

No reductions are made in the percussion.

Form 
 I  Fast Tempo (quarter = 192 in 4/4 time)
 II  Moderate Tempo
 IIIA  Slow Tempo
 IIIB  Moderate Tempo
 IIIC  Slow Tempo
 IV  Moderate Tempo
 V  Fast Tempo

The tempi between two sections are related by a ratio of 3:2, introduced at the end of each section by either tuplet or dotted  rhythms, respectively. So, I and V have 192 bpm; II, IIIB, and IV have 128 bpm; IIIA and C have 85 bpm.

Sections I and V have the same harmonic structure. Sections II and IV have both the same harmonic structure and the same words, and likewise Sections IIIA and IIIC.

Relation to other Reich pieces 

The piece opens similarly to many of Reich's other works: a piano or mallet instrument pulsing on the beat, with another piano or marimba soon fading in on the offbeats (Music for 18 Musicians, Sextet, Three Movements for Orchestra). Also characteristic of several of Reich's pieces, such as New York Counterpoint, Electric Counterpoint, Sextet, Music for 18 Musicians, Three Movements for Orchestra, the exposition of the pulse is followed by pulsed notes in the choir and orchestra fading in and out over the course of a chord progression. Also, the first movement prominently features a repeated rhythm found in several of the aforementioned works (in The Desert Music, however, the fourth and fifth note are tied together):

Twice in Section IIIC, the strings begin playing a slightly modified section from Reich's New York Counterpoint.

References

Compositions by Steve Reich
1983 compositions
Choral compositions